William Hosking Oliver  (14 May 1925 – 16 September 2015), commonly known as W. H. Oliver but also known as Bill Oliver, was an eminent New Zealand historian and a poet. From 1983, Oliver led the development of the Dictionary of New Zealand Biography.

Life
Oliver was born in Feilding in 1925 to Ethel Amelia Oliver and her husband, William Henry Oliver, both Cornish immigrants.

During his youth, the family moved to Dannevirke, where he received his schooling at Dannevirke High School. Upon leaving school at 18, he moved to Wellington where he studied at Victoria University of Wellington (MA), followed by three years of lecturing at that institution. He married Dorothy Nielsen, whom he had met at a Christian conference in Christchurch, and had five sons and one daughter with her.

In 1951, the Olivers moved to the United Kingdom, where he completed a PhD at the University of Oxford in 1953. They returned to New Zealand and he lectured at University of Canterbury and Victoria, before becoming inaugural professor of history at Massey University in 1965, where he later served as Dean of Humanities. He was made emeritus professor on leaving Massey in 1983 to become general editor of the Dictionary of New Zealand Biography (DNZB). He wrote extensively on New Zealand history and published several volumes of poetry. In the 1990 New Year Honours, he was appointed a Commander of the Order of the British Empire, for services to historical research, and also in 1990 he was awarded the New Zealand 1990 Commemoration Medal, and an honorary DLitt from Victoria University of Wellington in recognition of his services to history. In 2008, he was honoured in the Prime Minister's Awards for Literary Achievement in the non-fiction genre.

Oliver died in Wellington on 16 September 2015. His wife had died of pancreatic cancer during the time that he worked on the DNZB.

Works

History and biography
  1954: Organizations and ideas behind the efforts to achieve a general union of the working classes in the early 1830's PhD thesis, Faculty of Social Studies, University of Oxford.
 1960: The Story of New Zealand, London: Faber
 1960: Poetry in New Zealand, Wellington: School Publications
 1964: Problems and prospects of conservatism in New Zealand, Wellington: New Zealand National Party
 1968: Further steps towards a welfare state since 1935, Auckland: Heinemann Educational Books
 1971: Challenge and response: a study of the development of the Gisborne East Coast region, Gisborne: East Coast Development Research Association
 1978: Prophets and Millennialists, Auckland: Auckland University Press
 1981: The Oxford History of New Zealand, co-edited with Bridget Williams, Wellington: Oxford University Press
 1983: James K. Baxter: A Portrait, Wellington: Port Nicholson Press. .
 1990: Dictionary of New Zealand Biography, volume one, 1769–1869, (ed.), Wellington: Allen & Unwin/Department of Internal Affairs
 1991: Claims to the Waitangi Tribunal, Wellington: Waitangi Tribunal
 1996: The certainty of doubt: tributes to Peter Munz, (co-edited with Miles Fairburn), Wellington: Victoria University Press
 1997: The social and economic situation of Hauraki Maori after colonisation, Paeroa: Hauraki Maori Trust Board
 2002: Looking for the Phoenix: A Memoir, Wellington: Bridget Williams Books

Poetry
Books of poetry:
 1957: Fire Without Phoenix: Poems 1946–1954, Christchurch: Caxton Press
 1980: Out of Season: Poems, Wellington; New York: Oxford University Press
 1982: Poor Richard: Poems, Wellington: Port Nicholson Press
 1993: Bodily Presence: Words, Paintings, co-author: Anne Munz; Wellington: BlackBerry Press
 2005: Selected Poems, Wellington: Victoria University Press

References

External links
The Phoenix Project – collected poetic works
Poems by W H Oliver from The Spike 1948
Obituary: William Hosking Oliver 1925–2015

1925 births
2015 deaths
People from Feilding
People educated at Dannevirke High School
Academic staff of the Massey University
20th-century New Zealand historians
New Zealand poets
New Zealand male poets
Academic staff of the University of Canterbury
Academic staff of the Victoria University of Wellington
New Zealand Commanders of the Order of the British Empire
Fellows of the Royal Society of New Zealand
Victoria University of Wellington alumni
Alumni of the University of Oxford